María Rubio (September 21, 1934 – March 1, 2018) was a Mexican actress. She worked with Televisa on many telenovelas. She appeared as the villain Catalina Creel in the 1986–87 telenovela, Cuna de lobos.

Filmography

Films

Television

References

External links 

1934 births
2018 deaths
Mexican telenovela actresses
Mexican stage actresses
Mexican film actresses
Actresses from Baja California
20th-century Mexican actresses
21st-century Mexican actresses